This is the discography of British rock band Mallory Knox. They currently have released three studio albums, three EPs and ten singles.

Studio albums

Extended plays

Singles

Other songs

As featured artist

Music videos

As featured artist

Notes
=Are referenced in the video link.

References

Discographies of British artists
Rock music group discographies